Rusty Rebowe (born January 17, 1956) is a former professional American football linebacker in the National Football League (NFL) for the New Orleans Saints and in the Canadian Football League (CFL) with the Hamilton Tiger-Cats.

Playing career

High School career
Rebowe from Norco, Louisiana played high school football at Destrehan High School where he was named Class 3A state defensive most valuable player in 1973. His team won the 1973 LHSAA 3A state championship.

College career
Rebowe played college football at Nicholls State University. In his junior year in 1976, he was named second-team All-Gulf South Conference and during his senior year in 1977, he was named player of the year in the Gulf South Conference and was a consensus first-team Associated Press All-American, first-team Kodak All-American by the American Football Coaches Association (AFCA) and first-team NCAA All-American. He finished his career as the all-time leading tackler in school history with 655 total tackles (solo and assists), all-time leader in solo tackles with 412, all-time leader for tackles in a season with 239 and tackles in a game with 23.

Professional career
Rebowe was a free agent selection of the New Orleans Saints in 1978 and played for the team during the 1978 season. In 1979, he was a member of the Hamilton Tiger-Cats in the Canadian Football League.

Personal life
Rebowe's brother, Tim Rebowe, is the current head coach at Nicholls State.

References

External links
 

1956 births
Living people
People from Norco, Louisiana
People from Destrehan, Louisiana
Players of American football from Louisiana
American football linebackers
Destrehan High School alumni
Nicholls Colonels football players
All-American college football players
New Orleans Saints players
Hamilton Tiger-Cats players